Time Out (literally "Stadium Coup") is a 1998 Colombian film directed by Sergio Cabrera. It is a political satire, that as of 2016 was the highest-grossing Colombian films of all time.

Plot
The film is a political satire. An oil company locates a camp in a small village in Colombia, named New Texas, in order to do geological research. The village then attracts attacks by guerrillas, who are in constant battle with the local police. However, a kind of truce is called between the two sides during when the World Cup qualifying rounds are shown on television, and the match between Colombia and Argentina can only be seen on a single working TV in the town. Colombia wins 5–0, and the two opposing sides find that they are cheering for the same team.

Cast 
 Emma Suárez - María
  - Carlos
 César Mora - Sargento García
 Flavio Caballero - Comandante Felipe
  - Padre Bueno
 Raúl J. Sender - José Josu
 Lorena Forteza - Bárbara Berleti
 Andrea Giordana - Klaus Mauser
  - Álvarez
  - Lucía
 Mimí Lazo - Samara

Production
The film was an international co-production between Italy, Spain and Colombia. It was co-written by Ben Odell and others.

The title is a play on words: literally translated into English, Golpe de estadio means "stadium coup", while golpe de estado means "coup d’état".

Accolades
Golpe de estadio was Colombia's official Best Foreign Language Film submission at the 72nd Academy Awards, but did not manage to receive a nomination. It was also  nominated for the Goya Award for Best Spanish Language Foreign Film in 1999, was Colombia's Academy Awards entry in  2000.

Box office
Golpe de estadio remains one of the highest-grossing Colombian films of all time.

See also
 List of submissions to the 72nd Academy Awards for Best Foreign Language Film
 List of Colombian submissions for the Academy Award for Best Foreign Language Film

References

External links

Colombian comedy films
1990s Spanish-language films
1998 films
Italian comedy films
Spanish comedy films